Au (Sieg) station is a railway junction in the town of Au in the municipality of Windeck, which is in the German state of North Rhine-Westphalia. It lies on the Sieg Railway to Siegen, where the Engers–Au railway branches off to Altenkirchen, where it connects with the Upper Westerwald Railway (Oberwesterwaldbahn). Despite the town’s small population, the junction station is important for commuters from the districts of Altenkirchen, Neuwied and Westerwaldkreis for its connections towards Siegen, Cologne, Bonn, Düsseldorf and Aachen.

History
Au station was opened in August 1860 as part of the Deutz–Gießen railway by the Cologne-Minden Railway Company (Cöln-Mindener Eisenbahn-Gesellschaft). The Engers–Au railway (Oberwesterwaldbahn, Upper Westerwald Railway) to Altenkirchen was opened in May 1887, connecting to Engers. Thus, it became a railway junction with an enlarged track layout.

Since 2 June 1991, Au station has been the terminus of Cologne S-Bahn line S12. Since the modernisation of the track layout, which was completed at the end of 2013, Au (Sieg) station has had six platform platforms that are used in regular operations.

Transport connections

Au (Sieg) station has a commuter car park and a "bike and ride" cycle storage. There used to be a station restaurant in the station. In the station has a ticket office, which is operated by Westerwaldbahn GmbH (WEBA). The neighbouring municipalities of Hamm an der Sieg and Fürthen and the shores of the Sieg are within walking distance. The station, however, serves mainly as an interchange station.

Due to the location of the station in the municipality of Windeck in the Rhein-Sieg district, it is located in the network of the Verkehrsverbund Rhein-Sieg (Rhine-Sieg Transport Association). The fares of the Verkehrsverbund Rhein-Mosel (Rhine-Mosel Transport Association, VRM) also apply as a transitional stage for journeys with a start/finish station in the area of the VRM, which also includes the Altenkirchen district.

Until the introduction of the 2014/2015 timetable in December 2014, Au (Sieg) station was the terminus of two Regionalbahn lines. The RB 90 (previously RB 28, Oberwesterwaldbahn) service from Limburg (Lahn) via Diez Ost, Westerburg, Hachenburg and Altenkirchen ended in Au (Sieg). The RB 95 (Sieg-Dill-Bahn) service ran from Dillenburg via Siegen and Betzdorf (Sieg) to Au (Sieg). With the 2014/2015 timetable change, these two lines became a single through service, the RB 90 (Westerwald-Sieg-Bahn).

Until 2004, the services of the Dreiländerbahn, which also included the RB 28 until 2004 and the RB 95 until 2013, were operated by DB Regio. In 2004, Vectus Verkehrsgesellschaft took over the operations of the Upper Westerwald Railway between Limburg (Lahn) and Au (Sieg). In 2014, after winning the contract, the network of the Dreiländerbahn was taken over by Hessische Landesbahn GmbH (HLB). With the extension of the RB 90 to Siegen, the RB 95 service now runs only between Dillenburg and Siegen.

On the main line (the Sieg Railway from Cologne to Siegen), it is served by the Rhein-Sieg-Express, running from Aachen via Cologne and Betzdorf to Siegen (RE 9), along with the S-Bahn S 12 services from Köln-Ehrenfeld (Horrem in the peak) and on week days by S19 services from Düren. The RE9 and the S12 services operate hourly, but the S19 services are less frequent.

Buses and taxis 

Near the station there is a bus stop, where the buses of route 299 (Hamm an der Sieg – Au (Sieg) station – Hilgenroth – Altenkirchen station) stop.

There is a taxi stand in front of the station.

References

Railway stations in North Rhine-Westphalia
Rhine-Ruhr S-Bahn stations
S12 (Rhine-Ruhr S-Bahn)
Railway stations in Germany opened in 1860
Buildings and structures in Rhein-Sieg-Kreis